Fasching is a surname. Notable people with the surname include:

Bernd Fasching (born 1955), Austrian painter and sculptor
Hudson Fasching (born 1995), American ice hockey player in NHL
Kenneth Fasching-Varner (born 1979), professor of Education 
Wolfgang Fasching (born 1967), American cyclist, mountaineer, author and motivational speaker

See also
Fasch